David Linton (1815–1889) was one of eight founders of Beta Theta Pi, a college fraternity founded at Miami University in 1839.

He was born January 30, 1815, in Clinton County, Ohio, to Nathaniel Matthew Linton and Elizabeth Rachel Smith. He received his A.B. degree from Miami University in 1839 and his LL.B. from the University of Cincinnati in 1840. Linton worked as a lawyer in Wilmington, Ohio, Clinton County, Ohio, and finally Linn County, Kansas, where he was a probate judge (1867–69). Linton also served as a state senator for Ohio (1851–55) before he moved to Kansas. He died August 10, 1889, in Linn County.

See also

List of Beta Theta Pi members

Sources
 Brown, James T., ed., Catalogue of Beta Theta Pi, New York: 1917.

Miami University alumni
1815 births
1889 deaths
Beta Theta Pi founders
People from Linn County, Kansas
Ohio state senators
19th-century American politicians
19th-century American judges